During the 2002–03 season Cardiff City played in the Football League Division Two. They finished in six place and were promoted to Division One after beating Queens Park Rangers in the play-off final in Cardiff.

The season also saw Robert Earnshaw break the 56-year record of 30 league goals held by Stan Richards and the record of Hughie Ferguson of 32 goals in all competitions.

Squad

|}

Standings

Results by round

Fixtures and results

Division Two

Play-Offs

League Cup

FA Cup

LDV Vans Trophy

FAW Premier Cup

Notes

See also 
 Cardiff City F.C. seasons
 2002–03 in English football
 2003 Football League Second Division play-off Final

 

Cardiff City F.C. seasons
Cardiff City
Cardiff City